Agios Achilleios (before 1926: Αχίλλειον – Achilleion) is a village in the Florina Regional Unit in West Macedonia, Greece.

Demographics 
Agios Achilleios had 31 inhabitants in 1981. In fieldwork done by Riki Van Boeschoten in late 1993, Agios Achilleios was populated by Slavophones. The Macedonian language was spoken in the village by people over 30 in public and private settings. Children understood the language, but mostly did not use it.

References

External links
Prespes website

Populated places in Florina (regional unit)